Cloete or Cloëté is a surname, and may refer to:

Abraham Josias Cloëté (1794–1886), British Army officer
Chris Cloete (born 1990), South African rugby player
Francois Cloete, South African rugby player
Gareth Cloete (born 1978), Namibian cricketer
Hestrie Cloete (born 1978), South African high jumper
Johan Cloete (born 1971), South African cricket umpire
Patats Cloete (1873–1959), South African rugby player
Ruben Cloete (born 1982), South African football player
Shane Cloete (born 1971), Zimbabwean cricketer
Shirley Cloete (born 1982), Namibian football player
Stuart Cloete (1897–1976), South African writer
Tiaan Cloete (born 1989), South African cricketer 
Wesley Cloete (born 1990), South African rugby player
William Broderick Cloete (1851–1915), British industrialist

Afrikaans-language surnames